KB Besa Pejë is the first basketball Kosovan team from Peja City. It was founded in 1961. This team is part of the Kosovo Superleague.

History
The team was founded in 1961, and its first name was KK. Buducnosti. The board of the team was mostly serbian people. These years team have present Kosovo in first league of Yugoslavia with great results and a lot of trophy winners.
In 1979–80 the Albanian board of the team had change name of club from Buducnost to Ramiz Sadiku. The ex-secretary of team, Muhamet Ahma, was also the first coach of the new team. In this year the team debuted in Balkanska league who lost in semi-final from Mornar 74-75. The best player of us was Blerim Vuniqi. Then we continue to play in local league and in 1992 we're in final of play-off with Prishtina and we lost 30-36.

In 2012–2013 Arber Elshani was elected as president and he backed Besa Pejë team to win first league in 2012–2013 and to be part of Superleague after great season. Elshani as President of team for first time in team make some great thinks to make history. First he brought one from the best coaches in Croatia. The new head coach of Besa in that time was Mr. Boris Kurtovic who led the team in semi-final of final four of cup after a big win with Trepca in Gjakova with great result 70-83 with all local players and reality was great season. Then Elshani brought ex-Real Madrid player Venson Hamilton who for our fans in 2014 was totally unbelievable but Hamilton coming and in his first game he score 25 points 25 rebounds and 10 blocked shots to help Besa team to win against Milion team BC RTV21. Now Team Besa still works with local players and is one team for respect as always.
BC Besa since 2015 have been out from all leagues in Federation after a conflict between President of Federation and Board of Besa. Besa refused to give vote for him in election for new President of Federation and then they have go out our team from Superleague.

Titles and honors

Domestic
 Kosovo First Division (1):
2013

References 

Basketball teams in Kosovo